"Lonely Alone" is a song written by J. D. Martin and John Jarrard, and recorded by American country music group The Forester Sisters.  It was released in July 1986 as the first and only single from the album Perfume, Ribbons & Pearls.  The song reached #2 on the Billboard Hot Country Singles & Tracks chart.

Chart performance

References

1986 singles
The Forester Sisters songs
Warner Records singles
Songs written by John Jarrard
1986 songs
Songs written by J. D. Martin (songwriter)